Coast Capital Savings Federal Credit Union (formerly Coast Capital Savings Credit Union) is a member-owned financial co-operative headquartered in Surrey, British Columbia. By membership, it is among the largest credit unions in Canada with 535,000 members and $25.2 billion in assets. Coast Capital Savings has 52 branches in the Metro Vancouver, Fraser Valley, Okanagan and Vancouver Island regions of British Columbia.

History 
Coast Capital Savings found its beginnings in 1940 as a co-operative of British Columbia government employees later emerging as Pacific Coast Savings Credit Union throughout a series of mergers of local Vancouver Island credit unions. Seven years later, Surrey Metro Savings and Richmond Savings were formed in the Lower Mainland of British Columbia.

Coast Capital Savings Credit Union was created out of a merger on December 31, 2000 between Pacific Coast Savings Credit Union and Richmond Savings Credit Union. At the time, the merged entity's $3.2 billion in assets made it the second largest credit union in Canada behind Vancity's $6.4 billion. In June 2002, Coast Capital Savings acquired Surrey Metro Savings, expanding the reach of the credit union from Vancouver Island to the Fraser Valley.

In the years that followed the merger with Surrey Metro Savings, Coast Capital Savings has seen membership growth from 300,000 members in 2002, to 522,000 members in 2015. The asset base of the credit union has doubled from $6.1 billion to $12.6 billion between 2002 and 2012.

From October 17 to November 28, 2016, a vote was held for members on whether or not Coast Capital Savings should become a federal credit union. 79.2% of the 79,726 voting members voted in favour of moving forward to become a federal credit union, the announcement coming from a Special General Meeting held on December 14, 2016. Coast Capital Savings will be the second federal credit union, after New Brunswick's Fédération des caisses populaires acadiennes (UNI) in July 2016. Pursuant to a federal letters patent, Coast Capital is to be renamed as Coast Capital Savings Federal Credit Union (and in French Coopérative de crédit fédérale Coast Capital Savings) effective November 1, 2018.

Community Initiatives
Coast Capital Savings has a focus on youth in their work with the community, promoting the development of financial literacy, academic success, sound social belonging within the community, and stable mental health. Coast Capital Savings invests 7% of pre-taxed profits to programs that support youth in those areas. Notable initiatives of the credit union include the Canadian Cancer Society's Cops for Cancer campaign, the University of British Columbia's Innovation Hub, CKNW's Pink Shirt Day, and the United Way of Victoria's Youth In Action program.

Awards and distinctions
 2015 Giving Hearts Outstanding Corporation Award, Vancouver Chapter of the Association of Fundraising Professionals (AFP) (November 2015)
 Top Corporate Culture Award, Waterstone Human Capital (November 2014)
 Member of Canada's Best Managed Companies Platinum Club, (2000-2014)
 BC's Top Employers Award, Canada's Top Employers (February 2014)
 United Way Top Contributor Award, United Way Lower Mainland (March 2013)
 Top Chief Financial Officer in British Columbia, awarded to Don Coulter CEO, Business in Vancouver Magazine (2013)

External links
Coast Capital Savings website

References

1940 establishments in British Columbia
Banks established in 1940
Companies based in Surrey, British Columbia
Credit unions of British Columbia
Canadian companies established in 1940